The 1876 Enniskillen by-election was held on 15 February 1876.  The election was fought due to the incumbent Conservative MP, John Crichton, becoming Lord Commissioner of the Treasury.  It was retained by the incumbent.

References

1876 elections in the United Kingdom
19th century in County Fermanagh
February 1876 events
Enniskillen
By-elections to the Parliament of the United Kingdom in County Fermanagh constituencies
Ministerial by-elections to the Parliament of the United Kingdom
Unopposed ministerial by-elections to the Parliament of the United Kingdom (need citation)
1876 elections in Ireland